Typhoon Fury is a novel by Clive Cussler and Boyd Morrison, first published November 7, 2017.  It is book 12 in the Oregon Files series.

Plot
Juan Cabrillo and the Oregon's crew are imperiled by Filipino communist guerrillas armed with deadly aquatic drones. Owned by the Corporation, which conducts covert missions for the CIA, the Oregon looks like a derelict freighter but is powered by magnetohydrodynamic engines and carries exotic weaponry like Exocet missiles and a 120mm cannon. 

The ship is in the Pacific when Cabrillo is called to find a top-secret thumb drive sought by both the Ghost Dragon triad and the Chinese Ministry of State Security. 

That problem solved, Cabrillo and crew are told that Salvador Locsin, the communist New People's Army chief in the Philippines, has uncovered a lost Imperial Japanese WWII–era superdrug, Typhoon, developed from an exotic Philippine orchid. Typhoon is said to generate superhuman strength and provide "quick blood clotting and accelerated tissue regeneration,” sure to trigger chaos if it gets into the wrong hands. 

Purloined art by Renoir, Monet, Van Gogh, Raphael, Gauguin, and Cézanne bankrolls the assorted communist enterprises, and also forms part of the plot.

Reception
The book was well-received by most critics, including Publishers Weekly which said "Expertly drawn characters and a well-constructed plot make this one of Cussler’s better efforts" and Kirkus Reviews which said "Cussler and Morrison will always entertain when you're tired of binge-watching TV action shows."

References

External links
 Publisher's Book Webpage

2017 American novels
Novels by Clive Cussler
Novels set in the Philippines
Central Intelligence Agency in fiction
The Oregon Files
Collaborative novels
G. P. Putnam's Sons books
Michael Joseph books